Peter Moores may refer to:

 Peter Moores (businessman) (1932–2016), British philanthropist
 Peter Moores (cricketer) (born 1962), former English county cricketer and England national team coach

See also 
 Peter Moor, Zimbabwean cricketer
 Pete or Peter Moore (disambiguation)